Nepytia swetti is a species of moth in the family Geometridae first described by William Barnes and Foster Hendrickson Benjamin in 1923. It is found in North America.

The MONA or Hodges number for Nepytia swetti is 6905.

References

Further reading

 

Ourapterygini
Articles created by Qbugbot
Moths described in 1923